Richburg may refer to:
 Richburg, New York
 Richburg, South Carolina
 Weston Richburg, American football player